Me, Myself, and I may refer to:

Songs 
 "Me, Myself and I" (1937 song), performed by Billie Holiday
 "Me Myself & I" (5 Seconds of Summer song), 2022
 "Me, Myself & I" (Blonde song), 2018, featuring Bryn Christopher
 "Me, Myself & I" (Chalk Circle song), 1986
 "Me, Myself & I" (G-Eazy and Bebe Rexha song), 2015
 "Me, Myself & I" (Scandal'us song), 2001
 "Me, Myself and I" (Beyoncé song), 2003
 "Me Myself and I" (De La Soul song), 1989
 "Me, Myself and I" (Vitamin C song), 1999
 "Me Myself I" (song), by Joan Armatrading, 1980
 "Me, Myself and (I)", by Darren Hayes, 2007
 "Me, Myself & I", a song by Nikki Yanofsky from her 2016 EP Solid Gold

Albums 
Me, Myself, and I, a 2013 album by Michelle Chen
Me Myself and I, a 1993 album by Cheryl Pepsii Riley, or the title track
Me, Myself & I (album), a 2006 album by Fat Joe
Me, Myself + I, a 2001 album by Jive Jones, or the title track
Me Myself I, a 1980 album by Joan Armatrading

Films and plays 
Me, Myself and I (play), a 2007 play by Edward Albee
Me Myself & I (film), a 1992 film by Pablo Ferro
Me Myself I (film), a 2000 film by Pip Karmel
Corey Haim: Me, Myself and I, a 1989 documentary film on Corey Haim

Television 
Me, Myself & I (TV series), an American television sitcom

Books 
Me, Myself & I, a catalog collecting art by Bruno Peinado, made by Sylvia Tournerie

See also 
 "I / Me / Myself", a song by Will Wood from his 2020 album The Normal Album
 I Myself and Me, a 1992 album by Pernilla Wahlgren
 Me, Myself & Irene, a 2000 film by Peter Farrelly and Bobby Farrelly